Sam's Chicken is a British fast food chain. It has 34 outlets, the majority of which are in west and north west London. It was founded in 1990 by Sri Lankan Sam Chandrasinghe, with the opening of its first restaurant in Wealdstone, Harrow, north west London. Chandrasinghe had previously worked for KFC UK as deputy operations director.

Sam's Chicken's food is produced with 100% rapeseed oil, with its London stores certified with the ‘Healthier Catering Commitment for London’. Their products are also halal certified. Sam's Chicken pioneered the two burgers for £2 deal, which was revolutionary at the time.

Cricketers' branch
In March 2012, England cricketer Ravi Bopara opened a new branch in Tooting. The branch is managed by Bopara's brother Etinder and first cousin Gurinder and Ravi is believed to be an investor. Also in 2012, Sam Chandrasinghe had approached England cricketer Kevin Pietersen to become the owner of a branch. In 2014, it was reported that Bopara now owned two branches of Sam's Chicken, Tooting and East Ham:
"I remember when I was saying it when I was about 14 and I said to my mates that we're going to own a chicken shop one day because all we used to eat was chicken, so we wanted to sit and eat our own chicken without having to pay for it".

Controversy
In May 2009, the Evening Standard reported that 62 year old Sam Chandrasinghe said that his staff and shops had been targeted by Tamil youth as part of a hate campaign due to his Sinhalese background.

Health and safety
In March 2014, The Guardian reported on how food hygiene inspectors found a small windowless bedroom behind the busy kitchen of a Sam's branch in east London, and that combined with imported chicken pieces enabled chicken shops to offer low prices to keep poor consumers happy, even if local councils were not. In November 2013, Sam's Chicken were fined £1750 by Ealing Council for fly-tipping of 35 rubbish sacks over seven nights, the shop owner had previously been fined in 2011.

Locations
Apart from its strongholds in west and north west London, there are other branches around London including: East Sheen, Tooting, Croydon, Mottingham, Woolwich, East Ham, Tottenham, Holloway, North Finchley, Colindale, as well as Borehamwood and Watford. Outside London's orbital M25 motorway, Sam's Chicken has branches in Luton, Birmingham, Wellingborough, Northampton, Southampton, Bournemouth and Isle of Wight.

See also
Chicken Cottage
Morley's

References

External links
 

1990 establishments in England
British brands
Chicken chains of the United Kingdom
Fast-food chains of the United Kingdom
Restaurants established in 1990